Horacio Garza Garza is a Mexican politician from Tamaulipas affiliated with the Institutional Revolutionary Party (PRI) who has served as municipal president of Nuevo Laredo  and as federal deputy.

Political career
From 1991 to 1993 he served as federal deputy during the LV Legislature.   He has served two times as municipal president (mayor) of Nuevo Laredo, first from 1993 to 1995 and then from 1999 to 2001.   From 2002 to 2004 he served as local deputy in the Congress of Tamaulipas.   In 2006 he won a seat in the lower house of the Mexican Congress  hence was elected to serve during the LX Legislature.

Garza has occupied different position in the Tamaulipas public service.

Assassination attempt
In February 2007 Garza was shot and critically wounded by unknown individuals as he was going to the Quetzalcóatl International Airport to take a flight back to Mexico City. Garza's driver was shot to death.  Garza was rushed to a hospital in Nuevo Laredo and then to a hospital in Mexico City.

References

Living people
Municipal presidents in Tamaulipas
Members of the Chamber of Deputies (Mexico)
Institutional Revolutionary Party politicians
People from Nuevo Laredo
Members of the Congress of Tamaulipas
21st-century Mexican politicians
Year of birth missing (living people)
20th-century Mexican politicians